Pärnamäe is a village in Viimsi Parish, Harju County in northern Estonia. Pärnamäe has a population of 1,191 (as of 1 January 2011).

References

Villages in Harju County